Ashford-in-the-Water is a civil parish in the Derbyshire Dales district of Derbyshire, England.  The parish contains 62 listed buildings that are recorded in the National Heritage List for England.  Of these, two are listed at Grade II*, the middle of the three grades, and the others are at Grade II, the lowest grade.  The parish contains the village of Ashford-in-the-Water and the surrounding countryside, which includes two country houses, Ashford Hall and Thornbridge Hall.  These are both listed, together with associated structures and items in their grounds.  The River Wye passes through the parish, and four bridges crossing it are listed.  Most of the other listed buildings are houses, cottages and associated structures, and the others include a church, a churchyard cross, a former watermill, two public houses, a farmhouse, farm buildings, a vicarage, a well, a dovecote, and a milepost.


Key

Buildings

References

Citations

Sources

 

Lists of listed buildings in Derbyshire